"Do What's Good for Me" is a song recorded by Belgian/Dutch Eurodance band 2 Unlimited, released in October 1995 as the first single from their greatest hits compilation album, Hits Unlimited. Co-written by Anita Dels and Ray Slijngaard, it was a notable hit in Europe, reaching the Top 10 in Finland and Spain.

Critical reception
Larry Flick from Billboard wrote, "The ongoing wave of pop-NRG dance acts enjoying radio prominence owes a massive debt to this ever-hot European duo for getting the party started. Sadly, the act has yet to achieve U.S. success à la such offspring as Real McCoy, but this jumpy li'l jam could easily change that. The bassline throbs infectiously, while the interplay of male rapping and female singing pops with palpable chemistry." Ross Jones from The Guardian deemed it "a powerhouse anthem of self-discovery, robo-bass, and skipping beats". A reviewer from Music Week rated the song three out of five, adding that "Anita and Ray go for a harder-edged techno sound, resulting in a less radio-friendly track than many of their recent releases." James Hamilton from the magazine's RM Dance Update called it a "synth stabbed squawker".

Chart performance
"Do What's God for Me" scored chart success in many European countries, peaking at number 3 in both Finland and Spain. It managed a respectable 17th place on the Canadian RPM singles chart, while also charting in the Top 20 in Belgium, Denmark, the Netherlands and the UK. In the latter, it peaked at number 16 in its first week at the UK Singles Chart, on October 15, 1995. Additionally, the single was a Top 30 hit in Austria and Scotland, and a Top 40 hit in Sweden. In Australia, it only reached number 87.

Music video
The music video for "Do What's Good For Me" was directed by director Nigel Simpkiss and released in the UK in October 1995. It features Anita and Ray performing the song in a computer, on a website. Simpkiss also directed the music videos for "Let the Beat Control Your Body", "The Real Thing", "Here I Go" and "Nothing Like the Rain". "Do What's Good For Me" was uploaded to YouTube in July 2014, and as of September 2020, the video has got more than 140,000 views.

Track listing

 Canadian CD maxi
 "Do What's Good For Me" (Edit) (3:55)
 "Do What's Good For Me" (Extended) (6:05)
 "Do What's Good For Me" (Alex Party Remix) (5:08)
 "Do What's Good For Me" (X-Out Remix) (5:25)
 "Do What's Good For Me" (Aural Pleasure Mix) (9:00)
 "Club Megamix" (9:34)

 European and Japanese CD maxi
 "Do What's Good For Me" (Edit) (3:49)
 "Do What's Good For Me" (Extended) (6:03)
 "Do What's Good For Me" (Alex Party Remix) (5:06)
 "Do What's Good For Me" (X-Out Remix) (5:22)
 "Do What's Good For Me" (Aural Pleasure Mix) (8:58)
 "Club Megamix" (9:34)

 UK CD single no.1
 "Do What's Good For Me" (Radio Edit) (3:11)
 "Do What's Good For Me" (Extended) (6:03)
 "Do What's Good For Me" (X-Out Remix) (5:22)
 "Do What's Good For Me" (Alex Party Remix) (5:06)
 "Do What's Good For Me" (Aural Pleasure Mix) (8:58)

 UK CD single no.2
 "Do What's Good For Me" (Radio Edit) (3:11)
 "2U Megamix" (6:04)
 "Club Megamix" (9:34)

 US CD maxi
 "Do What's Good For Me" (Edit) (3:49)
 "Do What's Good For Me" (Extended) (6:03)
 "Do What's Good For Me" (Alex Party Remix) (5:06)
 "Do What's Good For Me" (X-Out Remix) (5:22)
 "Do What's Good For Me" (Aural Pleasure Mix) (8:58)

 7" single
 "Do What's Good For Me" (Edit) (3:49)
 "Do What's Good For Me" (Alex Party Remix) (3:50)

 Belgian 12" maxi
 "Do What's Good For Me" (Alex Party Remix) (5:06)
 "Do What's Good For Me" (X-Out Remix) (5:22)
 "Do What's Good For Me" (Aural Pleasure Mix) (8:58)
 "Do What's Good For Me" (Extended) (6:03)

 Italian 12" maxi
 "Do What's Good For Me" (Extended) (6:03)
 "Do What's Good For Me" (Edit) (3:49)
 "Club Megamix" (9:34)
 "Do What's Good For Me" (Alex Party Remix) (5:06)
 "Do What's Good For Me" (X-Out Remix) (5:22)
 "Do What's Good For Me" (Aural Pleasure Mix) (8:58)

 US 12" maxi
 "Do What's Good For Me" (Extended) (6:03)
 "Do What's Good For Me" (Alex Party Remix) (5:06)
 "Do What's Good For Me" (X-Out Remix) (5:22)
 "Do What's Good For Me" (Aural Pleasure Mix) (8:58)

Charts

Weekly charts

Year-end charts

Kids Like You and Me

In the Netherlands, a re-recorded version of this track entitled "Kids Like You And Me" was released in order to promote awareness of homeless youth.  The music remained the same while new lyrics were composed incorporating the messages of homeless youth. It was not released in the United Kingdom.

Track listing
 CD single 
 "Kids Like You And Me" (Radio Edit) (3:49)
 "Kids Like You And Me" (Instrumental) (3:49)

References

1995 singles
2 Unlimited songs
1995 songs
Songs written by Jean-Paul De Coster
Songs written by Phil Wilde
Songs written by Ray Slijngaard
Songs written by Anita Doth
Byte Records singles
Pete Waterman Entertainment singles
Music videos directed by Nigel Simpkiss